The Germany women's cricket team toured Oman in February 2020 to play a four-match bilateral Women's Twenty20 International (WT20I) series. The matches were played at the Al Amerat Cricket Stadium in Muscat. This was the first bilateral series for both sides with WT20I status since the ICC's announcement that full WT20I status would apply to all the matches played between women's teams of associate members after 1 July 2018. Germany won the WT20I series 4–0.

Squads

Tour match

WT20I series

1st WT20I

2nd WT20I

3rd WT20I

4th WT20I

References

External links
 Series home at ESPN Cricinfo

Cricket in Oman
Cricket in Germany
Associate international cricket competitions in 2019–20